Vila Maria is a municipality in the state of Rio Grande do Sul in the Southern Region of Brazil.

See also
List of municipalities in Rio Grande do Sul

References

External links

Municipalities in Rio Grande do Sul